"Melody: Sounds Real" is the second single from Ayaka.

The B-side track, "Blue Days", was used as an insert song for the Japanese dorama suppli/supply. The single was limited to a special 50,000 copy printing and has sold 24,466 copies.

Track listing

Charts

2006 singles
Ayaka songs
Songs written by Ayaka